Musa I was the ninth mansa of the Mali Empire, which reached its territorial peak during his reign. Musa is known for his wealth and generosity. He has been subject to popular claims that he is the wealthiest person in history, but his actual wealth is not known with any certainty. His riches came from the mining of significant gold and salt deposits in the Mali Empire, along with the slave and ivory trade.

At the time of Musa's ascension to the throne, Mali in large part consisted of the territory of the former Ghana Empire, which Mali had conquered. The Mali Empire consisted of land that is now part of Guinea, Senegal, Mauritania, The Gambia, and the modern state of Mali.

Musa went on hajj to Mecca in 1324, traveling with an enormous entourage and a vast supply of gold. En route, he spent time in Cairo, where his lavish gift-giving is said to have noticeably affected the value of gold in Egypt and garnered the attention of the wider Muslim world.

Musa expanded the borders of the Mali Empire, in particular incorporating the cities of Gao and Timbuktu into its territory. He sought closer ties with the rest of the Muslim world, particularly the Mamluk and Marinid Sultanates. He recruited scholars from the wider Muslim world to travel to Mali, such as the Andalusian poet Abu Ishaq al-Sahili, and helped establish Timbuktu as a center of Islamic learning. His reign is associated with numerous construction projects, including part of Djinguereber Mosque in Timbuktu. Musa's reign is often regarded as the zenith of Mali's power and prestige.

Name and titles

Mansa Musa's personal name was Musa, the Arabic form of Moses. Mansa, 'ruler' or 'king' in Mandé, was the title of the ruler of the Mali Empire. In oral tradition and the Timbuktu Chronicles, Musa is known as Kanku Musa. In Mandé tradition, it was common for one's name to be prefixed by their mother's name, so the name Kanku Musa means "Musa, son of Kanku", although it is unclear if the genealogy implied is literal. He is also called Hidji Mansa Musa in oral tradition in reference to his hajj.

Al-Yafii gave Musa's name as Musa ibn Abi Bakr ibn Abi al-Aswad, and Ibn Hajar gave Musa's name as Musa ibn Abi Bakr Salim al-Takruri.

In the Songhai language, rulers of Mali such as Musa were known as the Mali-koi, koi being a title that conveyed authority over a region: in other words, the "ruler of Mali".

Historical sources

Much of what is known about Musa comes from Arabic sources written after his hajj, especially the writings of Al-Umari and Ibn Khaldun. While in Cairo during his hajj, Musa befriended officials such as Ibn Amir Hajib, who learned about him and his country from him and later passed on that information to historians such as Al-Umari. Additional information comes from two 17th-century manuscripts written in Timbuktu, the Tarikh Ibn al-Mukhtar and the Tarikh al-Sudan. Oral tradition, as performed by the jeliw ( jeli), also known as griots, includes relatively little information about Musa compared to some other parts of the history of Mali.

Lineage and accession to the throne

Musa's father was named Faga Leye and his mother may have been named Kanku. Faga Leye was the son of Abu Bakr, a brother of Sunjata, the first mansa of the Mali Empire. Ibn Battuta, who visited Mali during the reign of Musa's brother Sulayman, said that Musa's grandfather was named Sariq Jata. Sariq Jata may be another name for Sunjata, who was actually Musa's great-uncle. The date of Musa's birth is unknown, but he still appeared to be a young man in 1324. The Tarikh al-fattash claims that Musa accidentally killed Kanku at some point prior to his hajj.

Musa ascended to power in the early 1300s under unclear circumstances. According to Musa's own account, his predecessor as Mansa of Mali, presumably Muhammad ibn Qu, launched two expeditions to explore the Atlantic Ocean (200 ships for the first exploratory mission and 2,000 ships for the second). The Mansa led the second expedition himself, and appointed Musa as his deputy to rule the empire until he returned. When he did not return, Musa was crowned as mansa himself, marking a transfer of the line of succession from the descendants of Sunjata to the descendants of his brother Abu Bakr. Some modern historians have cast doubt on Musa's version of events, suggesting he may have deposed his predecessor and devised the story about the voyage to explain how he took power. Nonetheless, the possibility of such a voyage has been taken seriously by several historians.

According to the Tarikh al-Fattash, Musa had a wife named Inari Konte. Her jamu (clan name) Konte is shared with both Sunjata's mother Sogolon Konte and his arch-enemy Sumanguru Konte.

Early reign

Musa was a young man when he became mansa, possibly in his early twenties. Given the grandeur of his subsequent hajj, it is likely that Musa spent much of his early reign preparing for it. Among these preparations would likely have been raids to capture and enslave people from neighboring lands, as Musa's entourage would include many thousands of enslaved people; the historian Michael Gomez estimates that Mali may have captured over 6,000 people per year for this purpose. Perhaps because of this, Musa's early reign was spent in continuous military conflict with neighboring non-Muslim societies. In 1324, while in Cairo, Musa said that he had conquered 24 cities and their surrounding districts.

Pilgrimage to Mecca

Musa was a Muslim, and his pilgrimage to Mecca, also known as hajj, made him well known across Northern Africa and the Middle East. To Musa, Islam was "an entry into the cultured world of the Eastern Mediterranean". He would have spent much time fostering the growth of the religion within his empire.

When Musa departed Mali for the hajj, he left his son Muhammad to rule in his absence.
Musa made his pilgrimage between 1324 and 1325 spanning 2,700 miles. His procession reportedly included 60,000 men, all wearing brocade and Persian silk, including 12,000 slaves, who each carried  of gold bars, and heralds dressed in silks, who bore gold staffs, organized horses, and handled bags. Musa provided all necessities for the procession, feeding the entire company of men and animals. Those animals included 80 camels which each carried  of gold dust. Musa gave the gold to the poor he met along his route. Musa not only gave to the cities he passed on the way to Mecca, including Cairo and Medina, but also traded gold for souvenirs. It was reported that he built a mosque every Friday. Al-Umari, who visited Cairo shortly after Musa's pilgrimage to Mecca, noted that it was "a lavish display of power, wealth, and unprecedented by its size and pageantry". Musa made a major point of showing off his nation's wealth.

Musa and his entourage arrived at the outskirts of Cairo in July 1324. They camped for three days by the Pyramids of Giza, before crossing the Nile into Cairo on 19 July. While in Cairo, Musa met with the Mamluk sultan al-Nasir Muhammad, whose reign had already seen one mansa, Sakura, make the hajj. Al-Nasir expected Musa to prostrate himself before him, which Musa initially refused to do. When he did finally bow, he said he was doing so for God alone. Despite this initial awkwardness, the two rulers got along well, and exchanged gifts. Musa and his entourage gave and spent freely while in Cairo. Musa stayed in the Qarafa district of Cairo, and befriended its governor, Ibn Amir Hajib, who learned much about Mali from him. Musa stayed in Cairo for three months, departing on 18 October with the official caravan to Mecca.

Musa's generosity continued as he traveled onwards to Mecca, and he gave gifts to fellow pilgrims and the people of Medina and Mecca. While in Mecca, conflict broke out between a group of Malian pilgrims and a group of Turkic pilgrims in the Masjid al-Haram. Swords were drawn, but before the situation escalated further, Musa persuaded his men to back down. Musa and his entourage lingered in Mecca after the last day of the hajj. Traveling separately from the main caravan, their return journey to Cairo was struck by catastrophe. By the time they reached Suez, many of the Malian pilgrims had died of cold, starvation, or bandit raids, and they had lost many of their supplies. Having run out of money, Musa and his entourage were forced to borrow money and re-sell much of what they had purchased while in Cairo before the hajj, and Musa went into debt to several merchants, such as Siraj al-Din. However, Al-Nasir Muhammad returned Musa's earlier show of generosity with gifts of his own.

On his return journey, Musa met the Andalusian poet Abu Ishaq al-Sahili, whose eloquence and knowledge of jurisprudence impressed him, and whom he convinced to travel with him to Mali. Other scholars whom Musa brought to Mali included Maliki jurists.

According to the Tarikh al-Sudan, the cities of Gao and Timbuktu submitted to Musa's rule as he traveled through on his return to Mali. According to one account given by Ibn Khaldun, Musa's general Saghmanja conquered Gao. The other account claims that Gao had been conquered during the reign of Mansa Sakura. Both of these accounts may be true, as Mali's control of Gao may have been weak, requiring powerful mansas to reassert their authority periodically.

Later reign

Construction in Mali
Musa embarked on a large building program, raising mosques and madrasas in Timbuktu and Gao. Most notably, the ancient center of learning Sankore Madrasah (or University of Sankore) was constructed during his reign.

In Niani, Musa built the Hall of Audience, a building communicating by an interior door to the royal palace. It was "an admirable Monument", surmounted by a dome and adorned with arabesques of striking colours. The wooden window frames of an upper storey were plated with silver foil; those of a lower storey with gold. Like the Great Mosque, a contemporaneous and grandiose structure in Timbuktu, the Hall was built of cut stone.

During this period, there was an advanced level of urban living in the major centers of Mali. Sergio Domian, an Italian scholar of art and architecture, wrote of this period: "Thus was laid the foundation of an urban civilization. At the height of its power, Mali had at least 400 cities, and the interior of the Niger Delta was very densely populated."

Economy and education
It is recorded that Mansa Musa traveled through the cities of Timbuktu and Gao on his way to Mecca, and made them a part of his empire when he returned around 1325. He brought architects from Andalusia, a region in Spain, and Cairo to build his grand palace in Timbuktu and the great Djinguereber Mosque that still stands today.

Timbuktu soon became the center of trade, culture, and Islam; markets brought in merchants from Hausaland, Egypt, and other African kingdoms, a university was founded in the city (as well as in the Malian cities of Djenné and Ségou), and Islam was spread through the markets and university, making Timbuktu a new area for Islamic scholarship. News of the Malian empire's city of wealth even traveled across the Mediterranean to southern Europe, where traders from Venice, Granada, and Genoa soon added Timbuktu to their maps to trade manufactured goods for gold.

The University of Sankore in Timbuktu was restaffed under Musa's reign with jurists, astronomers, and mathematicians. The university became a center of learning and culture, drawing Muslim scholars from around Africa and the Middle East to Timbuktu.

In 1330, the kingdom of Mossi invaded and conquered the city of Timbuktu. Gao had already been captured by Musa's general, and Musa quickly regained Timbuktu, built a rampart and stone fort, and placed a standing army to protect the city from future invaders.

While Musa's palace has since vanished, the university and mosque still stand in Timbuktu today.

Death

The date of Mansa Musa's death is not certain. Using the reign lengths reported by Ibn Khaldun to calculate back from the death of Mansa Suleyman in 1360, Musa would have died in 1332. However, Ibn Khaldun also reports that Musa sent an envoy to congratulate Abu al-Hasan Ali for his conquest of Tlemcen, which took place in May 1337, but by the time Abu al-Hasan sent an envoy in response, Musa had died and Suleyman was on the throne, suggesting Musa died in 1337. In contrast, al-Umari, writing twelve years after Musa's hajj, in approximately 1337, claimed that Musa returned to Mali intending to abdicate and return to live in Mecca but died before he could do so, suggesting he died even earlier than 1332. It is possible that it was actually Musa's son Maghan who congratulated Abu al-Hasan, or Maghan who received Abu al-Hasan's envoy after Musa's death. The latter possibility is corroborated by Ibn Khaldun calling Suleyman Musa's son in that passage, suggesting he may have confused Musa's brother Suleyman with Musa's son Maghan. Alternatively, it is possible that the four-year reign Ibn Khaldun credits Maghan with actually referred to his ruling Mali while Musa was away on the hajj, and he only reigned briefly in his own right. Nehemia Levtzion regarded 1337 as the most likely date, which has been accepted by other scholars.

Legacy
Musa's reign is commonly regarded as Mali's golden age, but this perception may be the result of his reign being the best recorded by Arabic sources, rather than him necessarily being the wealthiest and most powerful mansa of Mali. The territory of the Mali Empire was at its height during the reigns of Musa and his brother Sulayman, and covered the Sudan-Sahel region of West Africa.

Musa is less renowned in Mandé oral tradition as performed by the jeliw. He is criticized for being unfaithful to tradition, and some of the jeliw regard Musa as having wasted Mali's wealth. However, some aspects of Musa appear to have been incorporated into a figure in Mandé oral tradition known as Fajigi, which translates as "father of hope". Fajigi is remembered as having traveled to Mecca to retrieve ceremonial objects known as boliw, which feature in Mandé traditional religion. As Fajigi, Musa is sometimes conflated with a figure in oral tradition named Fakoli, who is best known as Sunjata's top general. The figure of Fajigi combines both Islam and traditional beliefs.

The name "Musa" has become virtually synonymous with pilgrimage in Mandé tradition, such that other figures who are remembered as going on a pilgrimage, such as Fakoli, are also called Musa.

Wealth

Mansa Musa is renowned for his wealth and generosity. Online articles in the 21st century have claimed that Mansa Musa was the richest person of all time. CelebrityNetWorth has been criticized for the unreliability of its estimates. Historians such as Hadrien Collet have argued that Musa's wealth is impossible to accurately calculate. Contemporary Arabic sources may have been trying to express that Musa had more gold than they thought possible, rather than trying to give an exact number. Furthermore, it is difficult to meaningfully compare the wealth of historical figures such as Mansa Musa, due to the difficulty of separating the personal wealth of a monarch from the wealth of the state and the difficulty of comparing wealth in highly different societies. Musa may have brought as much as 18 tons of gold on his hajj, equal in value to over US$957 million in 2022. Musa himself further promoted the appearance of having vast, inexhaustible wealth by spreading rumors that gold grew like a plant in his kingdom.

According to some Arabic writers, Musa's gift-giving caused a depreciation in the value of gold in Egypt. Al-Umari said that before Musa's arrival, a mithqal of gold was worth 25 silver dirhams, but that it dropped to less than 22 dirhams afterward and did not go above that number for at least twelve years. Though this has been described as having "wrecked" Egypt's economy, the historian Warren Schultz has argued that this was well within normal fluctuations in the value of gold in Mamluk Egypt.

The wealth of the Mali Empire did not come from direct control of gold-producing regions, but rather trade and tribute. The gold Musa brought on his pilgrimage probably represented years of accumulated tribute that Musa would have spent much of his early reign gathering. Another source of income for Mali during Musa's reign was taxation of the copper trade.

Character

Arabic writers, such as Ibn Battuta and Abdallah ibn Asad al-Yafii, praised Musa's generosity, virtue, and intelligence. Ibn Khaldun said that he "was an upright man and a great king, and tales of his justice are still told."

In popular culture
 Mansa Musa was portrayed in two games in the 4X video game series Civilization: Civilization IV and the Civilization VI expansion Civilization VI: Gathering Storm. In both games, he is the leader of the playable Malian faction.
 Mansa Musa was portrayed in the episode "Jeff Bezos vs. Mansa Musa" of the YouTube series Epic Rap Battles of History, where he is played by the rapper Scru Face Jean.
 The American rapper Anderson .Paak's third studio album, Oxnard, includes a track titled "Mansa Musa".

Footnotes

References

Citations

Primary sources

, translated in 
 , translated in 
, translated in

Other sources

 

 
 
 
 
 
 
 

 
 

 
 
 .
 
 .
 .
 .

External links

World History Encyclopedia – Mansa Musa I
 History Channel: Mansa Moussa: Pilgrimage of Gold at archive.org
Caravans of Gold, Fragments in Time: Art, Culture, and Exchange across Medieval Saharan Africa

13th-century births
Year of birth uncertain
1330s deaths
Year of death uncertain
People of the Mali Empire
Mansas of Mali
Guinean philanthropists
Keita family
14th-century monarchs in Africa
History of Mali
African slave owners
14th-century travelers